Thomas Jefferson Wheeler (November 16, 1803 Middlefield, Otsego County, New York – February 8, 1875 Conewango, Cattaraugus County) was an American physician and politician from New York.

Life
He came to Conewango about 1825, settled in the hamlet of Rutledge, and practiced medicine. He was Postmaster of Conewango for some time, and an associate judge of the Cattaraugus County Court from about 1834 to 1847. He was a presidential elector in 1836, voting for Martin Van Buren and Richard M. Johnson.

Wheeler was a member of the New York State Senate (6th D.) in 1846 and 1847.

He was buried at the Rutledge Cemetery in Conewango.

Sources
The New York Civil List compiled by Franklin Benjamin Hough (pages 135f, 147 and 329; Weed, Parsons and Co., 1858)
New York Annual Register (1834; pg. 81)
Rutledge Cemetery records
Biography transcribed from The History of Cattaraugus County (1879), at RootsWeb

External links

1803 births
1875 deaths
Democratic Party New York (state) state senators
People from Middlefield, New York
New York (state) postmasters
Physicians from New York (state)
New York (state) state court judges
1836 United States presidential electors
People from Cattaraugus County, New York
19th-century American judges